Association football is a popular sport in Tokyo, both in terms of participants and spectators. Tokyo is home to many football clubs.

Introduction
National Olympic Stadium was the home venue of the Japan national football team and has traditionally hosted the Emperor's Cup.

History
The Tokyo Shukyu-Dan was the first winners of the Emperor's Cup and the club is the oldest football club in Japan.

Clubs
The following table lists all the football clubs of Tokyo.

Honours
 J1 League (7)
 Tokyo Verdy (7)
 J.League YBC Levain Cup (5)
 Tokyo Verdy (3)
 FC Tokyo (2)
 Emperor's Cup (10)
 Tokyo Soccer Club (1)
 Astra Club (1)
 Tokyo Old Boys Club (1)
 University of Tokyo (1)
 Tokyo Verdy (5)
 FC Tokyo (1)

Stadiums
Tokyo National Stadium
Ajinomoto Stadium

Tokyo derbies 
Main Tokyo derby is match between Tokyo Verdy and F.C. Tokyo.

See also
 Sport in Japan
 Football in Japan
 Women's football in Japan
 Football in Osaka

References